Taiwan Power Company Football Club, often shortened to Taipower or , is a Taiwanese professional football club based in Fongshan District, Kaohsiung City which currently competes in the Taiwan Football Premier League. The club was founded in 1978 and is affiliated with Taiwan Power, the country's national utility company.

Nicknamed Nan-Ba-Tien (lit. Southern Overlord), Taipower are the most successful football club in Taiwan, having won 14 league titles, notably in 10 consecutive seasons from 1994 to 2004. With the exits of Flying Camel and Taipei City Bank F.C. in the late 1990s, Taipower and Tatung F.C. are the only two remaining football clubs never relegated from Taiwan Football Premier League. Taipower became the first Taiwanese club to win a major Asian title when they won the 2011 AFC President's Cup at home in Kaohsiung.

Current squad

Continental record

Honours

Domestic
 Taiwan Football Premier League
 Runners-up (3): 2017, 2018, 2019
 Intercity Football League
 Champions (6): 2008, 2010, 2011, 2012, 2014, 2015-16
 Enterprise Football League
 Champions (15): 1987, 1990, 1992, 1994, 1995, 1996, 1997, 1998, 1999, 2000–01, 2001–02, 2002–03, 2004, 2007, 2008
 CTFA Cup
 Champions (3): 1997, 2000, 2002

 Enterprise Football League is formerly known as National Men's First Division Football League.

Continental
AFC President's Cup 
 Champions: 2011

References

1979 establishments in Taiwan
Association football clubs established in 1979
Football clubs in Taiwan
Sport in Kaohsiung
Taiwan Power Company
Works association football clubs in Taiwan
AFC President's Cup winning clubs